RMS Empress of Scotland, originally SS Kaiserin Auguste Victoria, was an ocean liner built in 1905–1906 by Vulcan AG shipyard in Stettin (now Szczecin, Poland) for the Hamburg America Line.  The ship regularly sailed between Hamburg and New York City until the outbreak of war in Europe in 1914.  At the end of hostilities, re-flagged as USS Kaiserin Auguste Victoria, she transported American troops from Europe to the United States. For a brief time Cunard sailed the re-flagged ship between Liverpool and New York.

The ship was refitted for Canadian Pacific Steamships (CP) and in 1921, she was renamed Empress of Scotland—the first of two CP ships to bear that name.

The vessel ended service in 1930 and was sold for scrap. During the demolition of the ship, the vessel caught fire, broke in two and sank. The hulls were raised and scrapped.

Service history
Kaiserin Auguste Victoria was built by AG Vulcan Stettin in Stettin on the Baltic in 1905–1906. The new ship was ordered by the expanding Hamburg America Line. At 24,000 plus tons she was the largest passenger liner in the world from 1905 to 1907 until the advent of Cunard's .

When the keel was laid down as "Ship #264," this vessel was intended to be named SS Europa; she was to have been a sister ship to SS Amerika which was being built by Harland and Wolff in Belfast during the same period. At the time of her launching on 29 August 1905, her only peer in size was the slightly smaller Amerika which had been launched days earlier.

German Empress Augusta Victoria of Schleswig-Holstein permitted the vessel to be named after her and participated in the launching ceremonies.

The ocean liner provided accommodation for 472 first-class passengers and for 174 second class passengers. There was room for 212 third-class passengers and for 1,608 fourth-class passengers.

Kaiserin Auguste Victoria left Hamburg on 10 May 1906 on her maiden voyage to Dover, Cherbourg, and New York under the command of Captain Hans Ruser.  Thereafter, she regularly sailed the route between Hamburg and New York.

In 1910 the ship was to be used in experiments for the world's first ship-to-shore airplane flights by pilot John McCurdy. A special platform was built on Kaiserin Auguste Victoria to provide a runway for McCurdy's plane. Kaiserin Auguste Victoria then returned to sailing on her regular schedule. A similar experiment using airplanes launched at sea to carry mail was carried out on  twenty years later.

In June 1914, Kaiserin August Victoria made her last voyage under a German flag, sailing from Hamburg to Southampton, Cherbourg, and New York, and returning to Hamburg.

Interiors
Like her sister ship Amerika, the interiors of the Kaiserin Auguste Victoria were luxurious and included several cutting-edge amenities. The interiors were designed by the French architect Charles Mewès and the decoration entrusted to the English firm of Waring & Gillow, as had been the case with the Amerika. Like her older sister, the Kaiserin was installed with an elevator and offered an à la carte restaurant as an alternative to the main dining room. Both were complete novelties at the time. There was also a gymnasium, electric baths, massage rooms, a palm garden, children's playroom, music room, and a two-deck high smoking room.

World War I
 
During World War I, Kaiserin Auguste Victoria stayed in the port of Hamburg starting in August 1914. In March 1919, she was surrendered to Britain. The ship was chartered by the United States Shipping Board, and USS Kaiserin Auguste Victoria carried American troops from France to the United States. The ship made five crossings bringing troops home from the war.

Post war
On 14 February 1920, the ship was decommissioned by the United States Navy and chartered to Cunard. SS Kaiserin Auguste Victoria sailed between Liverpool and New York although her time with Cunard would be very short, likely because they found her interior too dated and her design too top-heavy.

On 13 May 1921, the ship was sold to Canadian Pacific and was renamed Empress of Scotland. The ship was refitted to carry 459 first-class passengers, 478 second-class passengers, and 960 third-class passengers; it was converted to fuel oil at the same time.

On 22 January 1922, Empress of Scotland embarked on her first voyage from Southampton to New York. On 22 April 1922, she made her second trans-Atlantic voyage, sailing the Southampton-Cherbourg-Quebec route. On 14 June 1922 she transferred to the Hamburg-Southampton-Cherbourg-Quebec service. In 1923, she was involved in a collision with SS Bonus at Hamburg.

In 1926, Empress of Scotland was refitted again, this time with accommodations for first-class, second-class, tourist-class, and third-class passengers. In 1927, another refit resulted in first-class, tourist-class, and third-class accommodations. On 11 October 1930, Empress of Scotland made her last voyage from Southampton to Cherbourg and Quebec.

When the new  came into service, Empress of Scotland was sold for scrap. She was gutted by a fire at the shipbreaker's yard at Blyth on 10 December 1930. She broke in two and sank. Later the breaker's yard raised the pieces, and the full scrapping of the hulks was completed by 1933.

See also
 List of ocean liners
 List of ships in British Columbia

Notes

References
 Michael, Paul. (2001).   Hermann Broch, Visionary in Exile: The 2001 Yale Symposium.  Woodbridge, Suffolk, UK: Boydell & Brewer. 
 Bird, Millard F. (1919).  U.S.S. Kaiserin Auguste Victoria at Sea, Independence Day, July 4, 1919.

External links

 The Ships List:  Passenger ships website
 Simplon Postcards:  Canadian Pacific postcard images
 New York Public Library Digital Gallery:
 NYPL ID 97716, unknown photographer:   Empress, starboard view
 SS Kaiserin Auguste Victoria on The Great Ocean Liners

 

1905 ships
Ships of CP Ships
Steamships of Germany
Ships of the Hamburg America Line
Steamships of Canada
Steamships of the United States
Steamships of the United Kingdom
Ocean liners
Cruise ships of Germany
Ships built in Stettin
Ocean liners of Canada
Maritime incidents in 1930